Acanthostigma multiseptatum is a species of fungus in the Tubeufiaceae family of fungi. It was isolated from decomposing wood in the Great Smoky Mountains National Park. A. multiseptatum differs from its cogenerate species by having longer asci and longer ascospores with more septa.

References

Further reading

Wijayawardene, Nalin N., et al. "Homortomyces tamaricis sp. nov. and convergent evolution of Homortomyces and Stilbospora." Phytotaxa 176.1 (2014): 156–163.
Sanchez, Romina Magalí, Andrew N. Miller, and Maria Virginia Bianchinotti. "A new species of Acanthostigma (Tubeufiaceae, Dothideomycetes) from the southern hemisphere." Mycologia 104.1 (2012): 223–231.

External links

MycoBank

Tubeufiaceae